Lieutenant General Sir David Tod Young  (17 May 1926 – 9 January 2000) was a senior British Army officer who served as General Officer Commanding Scotland from 1980 to 1982.

Military career
Educated at George Watson's College in Edinburgh, Young was commissioned into the Royal Scots in 1945. He was seconded to the Glider Pilot Regiment in 1949 and qualified as a pilot.

He served in the Malayan Emergency in the early 1950s and won his Distinguished Flying Cross operating at low levels over rugged jungle terrain with 656 Air Observation Squadron.

He was selected to be Commanding Officer (CO) of the 1st Battalion, Royal Scots in 1967. In 1970 he was appointed commander of the 12th Mechanised Brigade and in 1972 he became Deputy Military Secretary at the Ministry of Defence. He moved on to be Commander Land Forces at HQ Northern Ireland in 1975 at the height of the Troubles and then became Director, Infantry, in 1977. He was made General Officer Commanding Scotland and Governor of Edinburgh Castle in 1980, before retiring from regular service in 1982. He became Colonel Commandant of the Ulster Defence Regiment from 1986 to 1991.

In retirement he became Chairman of Cairntech Limited. He was also Chairman of the Scottish Committee of Marie Curie Cancer Care.

Family
He married Joyce Marian Melville in 1950; they had two sons. Following the death of his first wife, he married Joanna Oyler in 1988.

References

 

1926 births
2000 deaths
British Army personnel of World War II
People educated at George Watson's College
British Army lieutenant generals
Knights Commander of the Order of the British Empire
Companions of the Order of the Bath
Recipients of the Distinguished Flying Cross (United Kingdom)
Glider Pilot Regiment officers
Royal Scots officers
British Army personnel of the Malayan Emergency
British military personnel of The Troubles (Northern Ireland)